Ambulyx placida, the plain gliding hawkmoth, is a species of moth of the family Sphingidae. It is known from the Himalayan foothills of northern India, Nepal and Tibet.

The wingspan is 104–114 mm. It is similar to Ambulyx semiplacida, but can be distinguished by the much smaller subbasal spot on the forewing upperside.

References

Ambulyx
Moths described in 1888
Moths of Asia